Jean Bertoin (born 1961) is a French mathematician, specializing in probability theory.

Education and career
Bertoin received in 1987 his doctorate from University of Paris VI under Marc Yor with Étude des processus de Dirichlet. Bertoin taught and did research there and is now a professor at the University of Zurich.

In 1996 he received the Rollo Davidson Prize. In 2002 he was an Invited Speaker with talk Some aspects of additive coalescents at the International Congress of Mathematicians in Beijing. In 2012 he was an Invited Speaker with talk Coagulation with limited aggregations at the European Congress of Mathematicians in Kraków. He is a corresponding member of the Mexican Academy of Sciences.

His research deals with Lévy processes, Brownian motion, branching processes, random fragmentation, and coalescence processes.

His doctoral students include Grégory Miermont.

Selected publications
 Lévy processes, Cambridge University Press 1996.
 Random fragmentation and coagulation processes, Cambridge University Press 2006.
 Subordinators: Examples and Applications, in: Jean Bertoin, Fabio Martinelli, Yuval Peres, Lectures on Probability Theory and Statistics, Ecole d’Eté de Probailités de Saint-Flour XXVII - 1997, Lectures Notes in Mathematics 1717, Springer 1999, pp. 1–91. 
 with Jean-François Le Gall: "The Bolthausen–Sznitman coalescent and the genealogy of continuous-state branching processes." Probability theory and related fields 117, no. 2 (2000): 249–266. 
 with Marc Yor: "Exponential functionals of Lévy processes." Probability Surveys 2 (2005): 191–212.

References

External links
Prof. Dr. Jean Bertoin, Universität Zürich
Bertoin, Jean — Idref

20th-century French mathematicians
21st-century French mathematicians
University of Paris alumni
Academic staff of the University of Paris
Academic staff of the University of Zurich
1961 births
Living people
Probability Theory and Related Fields editors